Richland Springs High School or Richland Springs School is a public high school located in Richland Springs, Texas (USA) and classified as a 1A school by the UIL. It is part of the Richland Springs Independent School District located in northwestern San Saba County. In 2015, the school was rated "Met Standard" by the Texas Education Agency.

Athletics
The Richland Springs Coyotes compete in these sports - 

Basketball
Cross Country
6-Man Football
Golf
Powerlifting
Softball
Track and Field

Richland Spring's 6-Man Football Team has won 9 State Titles, the most by any 6-Man Football Team in the state of Texas.

State titles
Football
2004(6M), 2006(6M/D1), 2007(6M/D1), 2010(6M/D2), 2011(6M/D2), 2012 (6M/D2), 2015(6M/D2), 2016(6M/D2), 2019 (6M/D2)
Boys Golf
1967(B)

State Finalists
Football
2001(6M)

See also

List of high schools in Texas
List of Six-man football stadiums in Texas

References

External links
Richland Springs ISD

Schools in San Saba County, Texas
Public high schools in Texas
Public middle schools in Texas
Public elementary schools in Texas